Llewellyn Atkinson (18 December 1867 – 1 November 1945) was an Australian  politician. He was a member of the Australian House of Representatives from 1906 to 1929 and a member of the Tasmanian House of Assembly from 1931 to 1934, representing successive conservative parties.

Atkinson was born in Launceston, Tasmania and was educated at Launceston Church Grammar School. He enrolled at the University of Melbourne to study law in 1885, where he was resident at Trinity College. He was called to the bar in 1894 and became a solicitor, returning to Tasmania to practise at Latrobe and later forming a partnership with T. A. Scott. He was a member of the Latrobe Town Board and the board of management of the Devon Hospital and a prominent local Freemason, serving as master of the Concord Masonic Lodge and a longstanding member of the Latrobe Mistletoe Lodge. Atkinson was also a keen sportsman and a talented cricketer and footballer in his youth.

He was elected to the  Australian House of Representatives of Wilmot at the 1906 election and held it until his defeat by Joseph Lyons at the 1929 election, representing successively the Free Trade Party, the Anti-Socialist Party, the Commonwealth Liberal Party, the Nationalist Party and the Country Party, an independent and then Nationalist again. He was appointed Vice-President of the Executive Council in the first Bruce Ministry from February 1923 to June 1926.

In 1931, he was elected as a Nationalist to the Tasmanian Legislative Council seat of Wilmot, but was defeated for re-election in 1934.  He died at Latrobe in 1945 and was buried at the Latrobe General Cemetery. He never married, and resided with his sister at their family country home, "Frogmore".

Notes

People educated at Trinity College (University of Melbourne)
Free Trade Party members of the Parliament of Australia
Commonwealth Liberal Party members of the Parliament of Australia
Nationalist Party of Australia members of the Parliament of Australia
National Party of Australia members of the Parliament of Australia
Members of the Australian House of Representatives for Wilmot
Members of the Australian House of Representatives
Members of the Cabinet of Australia
Members of the Tasmanian Legislative Council
1867 births
1945 deaths
Politicians from Launceston, Tasmania
20th-century Australian politicians